There are a number of different types of craters that have been observed and studied on Mars.  Many of them are shaped by the effects of impacts into ice-rich ground.

Rampart craters
Rampart craters shows fluidized ejecta features.  They look like mud was formed during the impact. There are several basic types of rampart craters.

The single-layered ejecta type has a single rampart at the edge of the ejecta.  It is thought that these impacted into an icy layer, but did not go through the layer. 
 

Another rampart crater in the double-layer ejection crater.  It's ejecta has two lobes.  Studies have demonstrated that these can be formed from impacts that went all the way through an upper, icy layer and penetrated into a rocky layer that lies beneath the icy layer.

A third type of rampart crater, the multiple-layered ejecta crater, is similar to a double-layer crater, but it has more than two lobes or layers of ejecta.

A study of the distribution of these craters demonstrated that the thickness of a frozen layer on Mars varies from about 1.3 km (equator) to 3.3 km (poles).  This represents a great deal of frozen water.  It would be equal to 200 meters of water spread over the entire planet, if one assumes the ground has 20% pore space. The researchers assumed that the single-layer ejecta craters would all be within the icy layer, but the double and multiple layer ejecta craters would always penetrate the icy layer. By finding an average of the largest single-layer ejecta crater depth  and the smallest multiple-layer ejecta crater depth, the thickness of the icy layer, called the cryosphere was determined.

Pancake Craters
In the Mariner and Viking missions a type of crater was found that was called a "Pancake Crater."  It is similar to a rampart crater, but does not have a rampart.  The ejecta is flat along its whole area, like a pancake.  Under higher resolutions it resembles a double-layer crater that has degraded.  These craters are found in the same latitudes as double-layer craters (40-65 degrees).  It has been suggested that they are just the inner layer of a double-layer crater in which the outer, thin layer has eroded.  Craters classified as pancakes in Viking images, turned out to be double-layer craters when seen at higher resolutions by later spacecraft.

 ,

LARLE crater

LARLE craters are characterized by a crater and normal layered ejecta pattern surrounded by an extensive but thin outer deposit which ends in a flame-like shape.  The name LARLE stands  ‘low-aspect-ratio layered ejecta.  The low aspect part of the name refers to the outer part being very thin.  This outer thin layer is thought to erode away and the resulting crater would be a pedestal crater. If the outer layer were not there, the crater would be the same size as a pedestal crater.

 ,

Pedestal crater

A pedestal crater has its ejecta sitting above the surrounding terrain and thereby forming a raised platform (like a pedestal). They form when an impact crater ejects material which forms an erosion-resistant layer, thus causing the immediate area to erode more slowly than the rest of the region.

 

,

Expanded crater

An expanded crater is a type of secondary impact crater. Large impacts often create swarms of small secondary craters from the debris that is blasted out as a consequence of the impact.  Studies of a type of secondary craters, called expanded craters,  have given us insights into places where abundant ice may be present in the ground.   Expanded craters have lost their rims, this may be   because any rim that was once present has collapsed into the crater during expansion or, lost its ice, if composed of ice.

,

See also
 Areography (geography of Mars)
 Expanded crater
 Geology of Mars
 Impact depth 
 Impact event
 LARLE crater
 Pedestal crater
 Rampart crater
 Ray system 
 Secondary crater

References

Mars
Impact craters on Mars